Gwinner may refer to:

 Gwinner, North Dakota, an American city
 Clive Gwinner (1908–1998), British naval officer
 Eberhard Gwinner (1938–2004), German ornithologist

See also
 Gwinner–Roger Melroe Field, an airport in North Dakota